The Hastings Center Report is a bimonthly peer-reviewed academic journal of bioethics. It is published by Wiley-Blackwell on behalf of the Hastings Center (Garrison, New York). The editor-in-chief is Gregory Kaebnick. According to the Journal Citation Reports, the journal has a 2021 impact factor of 4.298. In 2018, it ranked it 5th out of 16 journals in the category "Medical Ethics".

The journal focuses on legal, moral, and social issues in medicine and the life sciences. It publishes a variety of article types that may take many forms:
 articles that explore philosophical and ethical issues in medicine, health care, technology, medical research, the use of human subjects in research, and the environment
 reports or reviews of empirical studies that implicate relevant philosophical and ethical questions
 short, provocative essays; case studies (which may be accompanied by commentary on the case)
 personal narratives about receiving or providing health care
 and brief commentary on relevant events in the news

See also 
 List of ethics journals

References

External links
 

Bioethics journals
Publications established in 1971
Wiley-Blackwell academic journals
Bimonthly journals
English-language journals
1971 establishments in New York (state)